Elohim is an American electropop recording artist, DJ, producer and singer-songwriter based in Los Angeles.

Career
At the age of five, Elohim began playing the piano and writing songs. She suffered from severe anxiety for most of her life, and has used music as a way to cope. The stage name "Elohim" is one of the Hebrew names for "God". The name inspired Elohim and moved her "in a really deep way" as it brought her "strength, solace, beauty and confidence."

Elohim's debut single is "Xanax", which was released in 2015 alongside other singles such as "She Talks Too Much" and "Bridge and the Wall", that are from her self-titled 2016 debut extended play. She also released "Half Love" as a single from her self-titled 2018 debut studio album. Elohim independently released the first part of her two-part album "Braindead" on May 10, 2019. In commemoration of Mental Health Awareness month, proceeds of the EP went towards various mental health initiatives. The EP deals heavily with the themes of mental illness. Elohim has supported various artists on tour included Blackbear, Louis The Child and The Glitch Mob. In February 2020 she embarked on a US tour called the "Group Therapy Tour." The tour was subsequently postponed due to COVID-19. On June 25, 2021, her second studio album, Journey to the Center of Myself, was released.

Discography

Studio albums

Extended plays

Singles

References

External links
 Elohim (Official website)
 Elohim (Official YouTube Channel)
Interview with The Fader
Interview with Mix Magazine
Interview with Paste Magazine

Musicians from Los Angeles
American DJs
American synth-pop musicians
Living people
Electronic dance music DJs
Owsla artists
Year of birth missing (living people)
American women in electronic music
21st-century American women
Singer-songwriters from California